In the hit series Fast N' Loud, Richard Rawlings and Aaron Kaufman travel the back roads, searching barns and open fields for that one rare ride to restore, and choosing the right car is the trick. Rawlings is the man with the eye, the gift for seeing that rare find; while Kaufman is the master mechanic who decides whether or not these relics are too far gone or the perfect basis for an overhaul at the Gas Monkey Garage. Once Rawlings wheels and deals for a good price, it's back to the Garage to set the design plan and begin the major teardown. Then, the major work begins, but time is money and the quicker they finish their cars, the quicker they can get them to auction.

Episodes

References

2013 American television seasons
2014 American television seasons